Vercelli railway station is the main station serving the city and comune of Vercelli, in the Piedmont region, northwestern Italy.  Opened in 1856, it forms part of the Turin–Milan railway, and is also a junction station for two other lines, to Valenza and Pavia, respectively.

The station is currently managed by Rete Ferroviaria Italiana (RFI).  However, the commercial area of the passenger building is managed by Centostazioni.  Train services are operated by Trenitalia.  Each of these companies is a subsidiary of Ferrovie dello Stato (FS), Italy's state-owned rail company.

Location
Vercelli railway station is situated at Piazza Roma, at the northwestern edge of the city centre.

History
The station was opened on 20 October 1856, upon the opening of the Torino Porta Susa–Novara section of the Turin–Milan railway.

Features
The passenger building is made up of three components: the central part has two levels and a large lobby consisting of five arches.  The single storey lateral wings spread symmetrically from the central part, and are smaller. The building is made of brick.  It is painted grey at ground floor level, and a rose colour above that level.

Train services
The station is served by the following services:

High speed services (Frecciabianca) Turin - Milan - Brescia - Verona - Vicenza - Padua - Venice - Trieste
Night train (Intercity Notte) Turin - Milan - Parma - Rome - Naples - Salerno
Night train (Intercity Notte) Turin - Milan - Parma - Reggio Emilia - Florence - Rome - Salerno - Lamezia Terme - Reggio di Calabria
Express services (Regionale Veloce) Turin - Chivasso – Vercelli – Novara – Milan
Regional services (Treno regionale) Chivasso - Vercelli - Novara
Regional services (Treno regionale) Vercelli - Mortara - Pavia

Train services to Casale Monferrato finished on 14 June 2013.

Passenger and train movements
The station has around 3.5 million passenger movements each year.  There are about 138 trains per day.

The trains stopping at Vercelli are Frecciabianca, Intercity Notte and regional trains. Their main destinations are Novara, Turin and Milan.

See also

History of rail transport in Italy
List of railway stations in Piedmont
Rail transport in Italy
Railway stations in Italy

References

External links

This article is based upon a translation of the Italian language version as at December 2010.

Vercelli
Railway stations in Piedmont
Railway stations opened in 1856